Vantaa Chamber Choir is a Finnish mixed choir which was established in the city of Vantaa in 1986.

Conductors
 Toivo Korhonen (1986–1998)
 Ilona Korhonen (1998–2011)
 Juha Kuivanen (2011–2012)
 Tiia Mustonen (2013–2014)
 Ilona Korhonen (2014–)

Discography
 Lauluja Kuninkaantien varrelta (1993) – Folk songs (VKCD 293)
 Oi muistatko vielä sen virren (1997) – Hymns (Fazer Finnlevy CD 0630-19117-2)
 Marian virsi (2005) – Poems from Kalevala with modern arrangements (VKCD 305)

External links
 Vantaa Chamber Choir – homepage

Finnish choirs
Musical groups established in 1986
1986 establishments in Finland